Cobalt laurate is an metal-organic compound with the chemical formula . It is classified as a metallic soap, i.e. a metal derivative of a fatty acid (lauric acid).

Synthesis
Cobalt laurate can be prepared by the reaction of aqueous solutions of cobalt(II) chloride (CoCl2) with sodium laurate.

Physical properties
Cobalt laurate forms dark violet crystals.

It does not dissolve in water, but is soluble in alcohol.

References

Laurates
Cobalt compounds